Cara Black and Rennae Stubbs were the defending champions, but Black did not compete this year. Stubbs partnered with Lisa Raymond and were eliminated in first round.

Bryanne Stewart and Samantha Stosur won the title by walkover, as Elena Dementieva (partnering with Ai Sugiyama) had to withdraw due to a heat illness. It was the 1st title for Stewart and the 1st title for Stosur, in their respective doubles careers.

Seeds

Draw

Draw

References
 Main and Qualifying Draws

Medibank
2005 Medibank International